Bobi is a town in the Northern Region of Uganda.

Location
The coordinates of the town are 2°33'16.0"N, 32°21'28.0"E (Latitude:2.554441; Longitude:32.357782).

Points of interest
The following points of interest lie within the town limits or close to the edges of the town:
 offices of Bobi urban council
 Bobi central market
 Kamdini–Gulu Road, passing through the middle of town.

See also
Acholi people
List of roads in Uganda
List of cities and towns in Uganda

References

Populated places in Northern Region, Uganda
Cities in the Great Rift Valley
Gulu District